Connellsville or Connelsville may refer to:

Connellsville, Pennsylvania, a city in Fayette County
Connellsville, Utah, a ghost town in Emery County
Connelsville, Missouri, an unincorporated community in Nineveh Township